The End Is Where We Begin is the sixth studio album by Canadian rock band Thousand Foot Krutch. It was released on April 17, 2012, in the United States, and was released in Canada on May 8, 2012. Vocalist Trevor McNevan has stated "the record is some of the heaviest stuff we've done and some of the lightest".

Background
On November 29, 2011, they announced that they would be leaving Tooth & Nail Records to release the album independently. The band has set up a webpage offering various fans pre-release packages in exchange for advance support for the costs in recording and releasing the album. Fans who donated to the band received early downloads of the songs "The End is Where We Begin" and "Courtesy Call" on January 7, 2012. The official release date was announced as April 17, 2012, via the band's Twitter feed.

"War of Change" was used by WWE as the official theme song to their Over the Limit 2012 pay-per-view event.

The song "Light Up The Sky", is featured in the official EA Sports NHL 13 Video Game Soundtrack, which features sixteen songs in the official version. This song also has been played in several FM Radio stations all around Canada and the United States.

Commercial performance
The album debuted at No. 14 on the US Billboard 200, selling 23,000 copies.
The album also debuted No. 1 in "Hard Rock" and "Christian" albums. In September 2021 the song "Courtesy Call" was certified gold in the United States by the RIAA.

Track listing

TFK Remixes EP

In honor of their historic debut on Billboard, Thousand Foot Krutch made two remixed songs and gave them out for free on October 1. The remixes are made with a style similar to Trance, using McNevan's vocals and excluding guitars or drums.

Follow-up remix albums 
On the "RadioU" official page, it was announced that Thousand Foot Krutch would be releasing an entire remix album in response to the positive feedback they received from their TFK Remixes EP songs. The name of the album, Metamorphosiz: The End Remixes Vol. 1, was announced on November 1.
On January 19, 2013, McNevan announced that they will be releasing another remix album in 2013.

Personnel
Aaron Sprinkle - producer, keyboards, additional guitars 
Trevor McNevan - producer, vocals, guitar, acoustic guitar
Joel Bruyere - bass guitar
Steve Augustine - drums, percussion

Chart performance

Album charts

Year-end charts

References 

2012 albums
Thousand Foot Krutch albums
Self-released albums